Kjell Tomas Forslund (born 24 November 1968) is a Swedish former professional ice hockey right wing.  Forslund began his hockey career with Leksands IF in his native Sweden.  He was drafted 85th overall by the Calgary Flames in the 1988 NHL Entry Draft and after three more seasons in Sweden, he signed for the Flames in 1991.  He split his time with the Flames and the Salt Lake Golden Eagles of the International Hockey League during his first year, in which he played 38 games for Calgary, scoring 5 goals and 9 assists for 14 points.  In his second year however he played just 6 more games for the Flames, scoring 2 assists as he spent much of the season in Salt Lake.  Forslund returned to Leksands in 1993 and then moved to Germany to play for Deutsche Eishockey Liga club Kölner Haie where he spent five seasons.  He then went back to Leksands and played one more season before retiring.

Career statistics

Regular season and playoffs

International

External links
 

1968 births
Calgary Flames draft picks
Calgary Flames players
Kölner Haie players
Leksands IF players
Living people
People from Falun
Salt Lake Golden Eagles (IHL) players
Swedish ice hockey right wingers
Sportspeople from Dalarna County